"Clair de lune" (French for "Moonlight") is a poem written by French poet Paul Verlaine in 1869. It is the inspiration for the third and most famous movement of Claude Debussy's 1890 Suite bergamasque. Debussy also made two settings of the poem for voice and piano accompaniment. The poem has also been set to music by Gabriel Fauré, Louis Vierne, Sigfrid Karg-Elert, Josef Szulc, and Alphons Diepenbrock.

Text 

poeticized English translation (introductory stanza not literal):
we gaze upon the moon
our dreams sing in revelry 
her light plays in air and water
dazzling plumes
her shadow dances in the branches
of trees that line the countryside 

the soul’s countryside;
masks and fantasy masks
enchanting,  playing lutes and dancing,
melancholy beneath façades 

soul sings in minor key
of triumphant love and luck
disbelieving its own song;
its shadow cries with moonlight 

calm, clear, winsome moon
who makes birds sing in the trees
illuminating marble statues
playing on thin, dazzling plumes 
of water weeping from far-away fountains.

References

Au Clair De La Lune

External links

Poetry by Paul Verlaine
1869 poems